The Product Liability Directive 85/374/EEC is a directive of the Council of the European Communities (now the European Union) which created a regime of strict liability for defective products applicable in all member states of the European Union, the other EEA members (Iceland, Liechtenstein and Norway) and the United Kingdom.

Background
The Council adopted a resolution in 1975 for a preliminary programme on consumer protection and information technology. Moves towards a strict liability regime in Europe began with the Council of Europe Convention on Products Liability in regard to Personal Injury and Death (the Strasbourg Convention) in 1977. The Pearson Commission in the UK noted that this work had started, and refrained from making their own recommendations. A second EU programme followed in 1981.

The preamble to the directive cites Art. 100 (subsequently renumbered to Art. 94, then to Art. 115) of the Treaty of Rome and the aim to achieve a single market:

The preamble then goes on:

Content
Articles 1 to 12 create a scheme of strict product liability for damage arising from defective products. This liability is in addition to any existing rights that consumers enjoy under domestic law (article 13).

The directive does not extend to nuclear accidents, these being covered by existing international conventions (article 14). The original directive did not extend to game or primary agricultural produce (article 2) but this exception was repealed by  directive 1999/34/EC following concerns over BSE.

Development risks defence
Article 15(1)(b) of the directive gives member states the option of adopting the development risks defence:

, all EU member states other than Finland and Luxembourg had taken advantage of it to some extent.

Implementation by state
Because EU directives do not have direct effect, they only come into force on persons in member states when implemented in national legislation. Article 19 demanded implementation within 3 years.

Review 
Article 21 demanded that the Commission report to the council on the application of the directive every five years.

In 2021, the European Commission conducted an Impact Assessment study on the possible revision of the Product Liability Directive.

Notes

References

European Commission (1999) Green Paper - Liability for defective products, COM(1999)396 final

External links
Text of the original Directive
Text of the amending Directive 1999/34/EC

Safety
Product liability
1985 in law
1985 in international relations
1985 in the European Economic Community